Six Feet Under, Vol. 2: Everything Ends is a soundtrack album to the HBO drama series Six Feet Under, released in 2005 on Astralwerks.  This album was nominated for the Grammy Award for Best Compilation Soundtrack for Visual Media in 2006, and was chosen as number 96 of Amazon.com's Top 100 Editor's Picks of 2005.

Track listing
 Nina Simone, "Feeling Good" (2:53)
 Jem, "Amazing Life" (4:02)
 Phoenix, "Everything Is Everything" (3:00)
 Coldplay, "A Rush of Blood to the Head" (5:50)
 Sia, "Breathe Me" (4:31)
 Radiohead, "Lucky" (4:17)
 Irma Thomas, "Time Is on My Side" (2:50)
 Bebel Gilberto, "Aganjú (The Latin Project Remix)" (4:07)
 Interpol, "Direction" (3:54)
 Caesars, "(Don't Fear) The Reaper" (4:14)
 Death Cab for Cutie, "Transatlanticism" (7:55)
 Arcade Fire, "Cold Wind" (3:24)
 Imogen Heap, "I'm a Lonely Little Petunia (In an Onion Patch)" (0:59)

References

Six Feet Under (TV series)
Television soundtracks
2005 soundtrack albums
Astralwerks soundtracks